Statistics of Emperor's Cup in the 1953 season.

Overview
It was contested by 16 teams. All Kwangaku won the final and the championship.

Results

1st Round
Toyama Club 0–2 Osaka Club
All Rikkyo 4–1 Tohoku Gakuin University
Chuo University 8–0 Kagoshima Soccer
Toyo Industries 4–0 All Doshisha University
Muroran Club (retired) – All Kwangaku
Tokyo University of Education 3–1 All Yamanashi
Matsuyama MUC 2–6 Rokko Club
All Keio 9–0 Kariya Club

Quarterfinals
Osaka Club 3–1 All Rikkyo
Chuo University 1–2 Toyo Industries
All Kwangaku 2–1 Tokyo University of Education
Rokko Club 1–3 All Keio

Semifinals
Osaka Club 3–1 Toyo Industries
All Kwangaku 2–1 All Keio

Final
 
Osaka Club 4–5 All Kwangaku
All Kwangaku won the championship.

References
 NHK

Emperor's Cup
1953 in Japanese football